Trophy Night : The Best of Weddings Parties Anything is a compilation album released by Australian rock band Weddings Parties Anything.  It comprises songs from the band's seven studio albums together with two new tracks: "Anthem" and "Traffic Goes By", together with a cover of The Triffids' "Wide Open Road".
Trophy Night was also released for a limited time with a bonus disc Benched, a collection of unreleased demos and assorted B-sides.

In early August 1998, Weddings, Parties, Anything announced that they were calling it a day, one month before this long-planned retrospective was to be released. The material for this best-of was compiled by allowing fans to pick heir favorite songs through the band's website. All the band's original songs on the album are written by Mick Thomas. Dave Steel wrote 5 songs on the first albums but none are included here.

"Anthem" was the only song released as a single from the album. It is a cover of a Tiddas song written by Dan Warner and Sally Dastey, which appears on their 1996 self-titled album, produced by Joe Camilleri.

Track listing
All songs written by Mick Thomas, except where noted.
 "Away Away" - 3:51
 "Woman Of Ireland" - 2:47
 "Hungry Years" - 4:22
 "Scorn Of The Women" - 5:24
 "Industrial Town" - 4:07
 "Under The Clocks" - 3:30
 "Roaring Days" - 2:55
 "Sergeant Small" (Tex Morton) - 3:13
 "Ticket In Tatts" - 3:47
 "A Tale They Won't Believe" - 7:00
 "Knockbacks In Halifax" - 3:26
 "Step In, Step Out" - 4:00
 "Father's Day"
 "Rain In My Heart" - 4:01
 "Monday's Experts" - 2:54
 "Wide Open Road" (David McComb) - 4:19
 "For A Short Time" - 5:13
 "Anthem" (Sally Dastey, Dan Warner) - 4:17
 "Traffic Goes By" - 3:05

Benched

Track listing
All songs written by Mick Thomas, except where noted.
 "Been Coming Here For Years" - 4:17
 "City Of Lights" - 3:49
 "If You Gotta Go" (D Williams, M Duncan) - 3:20
 "The Swans Return" - 2:48
 "Tough Time" - 3:09
 "All Over Bar The Shouting" - 3:04
 "Everywhere I Go" - 2:48
 "Nothing Left To Say" - 2:52
 "One Perfect Day" (Roger Wells) - 4:57

Personnel
 Mick Thomas
 Jen Anderson
 Stephen O'Prey
 Paul Thomas
 Mark Wallace
 Michael Barclay
 Janine Hall
 Marcus Schintler
 Dave Steel
 Peter Lawler
 Richard Burgman

Charts

References

External links
 Trophy Night @ MusicBrainz
 Benched @ MusicBrainz

Weddings Parties Anything albums
Compilation albums by Australian artists
1998 compilation albums